Love on a Bet is a 1936 American romantic comedy film directed by Leigh Jason using a screenplay by P. J. Wolfson and Philip G. Epstein, based on a story by Kenneth Earl. The film stars Gene Raymond, Wendy Barrie, and Helen Broderick, and was released by RKO Radio Pictures on February 1, 1936.

Plot
To finance a new play, Michael McCreigh needs $15,000. He proposes an outrageous wager with his rich Uncle Carlton, that without clothes or money, Michael can make it from New York City to Los Angeles in 10 days, and arrive there in a new suit with $100. If not, he will quit the theater and go into his uncle's meatpacking business.

Dropped off from a limousine in only his undergarments, Michael dashes into a diner. There he encounters Paula Gilbert and her beau Jackson Wallace, promptly stealing her coat and his tux. While hitchhiking, by coincidence, Paula and her Aunt Charlotte come along.

To the consternation of her aunt, who prefers Jackson's prospects, Paula begins to fall for Michael. His various schemes earn him money on the way west, but after two escaped convicts rob them, Paula becomes aware of Michael's bet and is disappointed in him. He manages to get to L.A. just in time, with reward money for capturing the fugitives, and Paula forgives him. Then she demands that he go into his uncle's meatpacking trade after all.

Cast
 Gene Raymond as Michael
 Wendy Barrie as Paula
 Helen Broderick as Aunt Charlotte
 William Collier, Sr. as Uncle Carlton
 Spencer Charters as Plaza Ritz Hotel Owner
 Walter Johnson as 	Stephen Dody
 Jack Randall as Jackson
 Eddie Gribbon as Donovan, Escaped Convict
 Morgan Wallace as Morton, Escaped Convict
 William B. Davidson as 	A.W. Hutchinson
 Minerva Urecal as Miss Jones, MacCreigh's Secretary 
 Lloyd Ingraham as 	Bertram 
 Billy Gilbert as 	New York Policeman 
 Lynton Brent as 	Reporter 
 Maxine Jennings as 	Telephone Operator
 Irving Bacon as 	Farmer on Hay Wagon

References

External links

American romantic comedy films
1936 romantic comedy films
American black-and-white films
1936 films
RKO Pictures films
Films directed by Leigh Jason
1930s English-language films
1930s American films